Tharatip Sridee nickname "The Gymnast Queen" born February 21, 1987, is a female gymnast from Thailand.

Career
Tharatip was born in Bangna district, Bangkok, Thailand. She has an elder brother and a twin sister. In 2001, she was selected by Thailand national gymnastic team to compete at SEA Games, hosted by Malaysia and received a silver medal.

In 2003, she competed at SEA Games again, this time hosted by Vietnam. She won 2 gold medals, 2 silvers and 2 bronzes.

In 2005 SEA Games at Philippines she won 2 gold medals, 2 silvers and 2 bronzes.

In 2007 SEA Games at Thailand she won 2 gold medals and 4 silvers.

In 2011 at the Rhythmic Gymnastics World Championships Sridee received a rank qualification of 58.

References

External links
 Tharatip's Facebook

1987 births
Living people
Tharatip Sridee
Gymnasts at the 2006 Asian Games
Gymnasts at the 2010 Asian Games
Tharatip Sridee
Tharatip Sridee
Tharatip Sridee
Southeast Asian Games medalists in gymnastics
Competitors at the 2001 Southeast Asian Games
Competitors at the 2003 Southeast Asian Games
Competitors at the 2005 Southeast Asian Games
Competitors at the 2007 Southeast Asian Games
Tharatip Sridee
Tharatip Sridee